The 1999 St. Louis Rams season was the team's 62nd year with the National Football League (NFL) and the fifth season in St. Louis, Missouri.  The Rams finished the regular-season with a record of 13–3, and defeated the Tennessee Titans in Super Bowl XXXIV.

It was the team's first playoff appearance in St. Louis, their first since 1989, and their first division title since 1985.
The Rams were undefeated at home for the first time since 1973. On the road, the Rams were 5–3. 

In the post-season, they defeated the Minnesota Vikings, who had just posted one of the greatest offenses in NFL history the year before, by a score of 49–37 in the NFC Divisional Playoffs and went on to defeat the Tampa Bay Buccaneers 11–6 in the NFC Championship Game. These were the first NFL playoff games ever played in St. Louis. The Rams then won their first ever Super Bowl title, defeating the Tennessee Titans by a score of 23–16 in Super Bowl XXXIV. The game was played on January 30, 2000 at the Georgia Dome in Atlanta. It was also the franchise's first NFL championship since 1951, when the Rams played in Los Angeles. The Rams also became the first “dome-field” (indoor home games) team to win a Super Bowl. It was also the last time that the Rams won the Super Bowl prior to 2021.

It was the first season of the Rams’ “Greatest Show on Turf” offense. The 1999 Rams remain one of only five teams in NFL history to score more than 30 points twelve separate times in a single season. On defense, the Rams recorded seven interceptions returned for touchdowns, third most in NFL history.

The Rams were the third St. Louis-based pro sports team to win a major championship, joining the, then, nine-time World Series Champion St. Louis Cardinals of Major League Baseball and the 1957–58 St. Louis (now Atlanta) Hawks of the NBA. They would be followed by two more World Series championships by the St. Louis Cardinals and a championship by the St. Louis Blues in the 2019 Stanley Cup Finals which made St. Louis the eighth city to win a championship in each of the four major U.S. sports.

Quarterback Kurt Warner was the MVP in both the regular season and in Super Bowl XXXIV.

It was the final season the Rams wore their 1973–1999 uniforms that had been synonymous with their time in Los Angeles (they brought them back as their home uniform set beginning in 2018 after their return to L.A.). This season would start a period of strength for the Rams, as they would post a winning record in all but one season from this year to 2003. The 1999 Rams team ranked #11 on the 100 greatest teams of all time presented by the NFL on its 100th anniversary.

Offseason
After a poor showing from the Rams offense in the previous 1998 season, Rams VP John Shaw suggested the Rams hire Mike Martz, and Vermeil and the team agreed. Martz advocated for the Rams to sign quarterback Trent Green, which the team did. This made Tony Banks expendable, and he was traded, which moved Kurt Warner from third-string to backup quarterback. VP Shaw also acquired Marshall Faulk from the Indianapolis Colts in exchange for two draft picks. The team also signed guard Adam Timmerman and linebacker Todd Collins, both of whom became starters.

NFL Draft

Personnel

Staff

Final roster

Preseason

Schedule

Regular season

Schedule

Game summaries

Week 1: vs. Baltimore Ravens

Quarterback Kurt Warner threw for 309 yards and three touchdowns in his first NFL start. The Rams pass defense notched five sacks and two interceptions against Ravens quarterback Scott Mitchell.

Week 3: vs. Atlanta Falcons

Kurt Warner was named NFC Offensive Player of the Week, completing 17 of 25 passes for 275 yards, three touchdown passes and also ran for another. Warner threw his first touchdown pass on the first play of the second quarter, hooking up with Torry Holt on a 38-yard strike. After an interception by defensive back Todd Lyght, Warner hit Isaac Bruce with a 46-yard touchdown. Bruce caught three passes for 68 yards. Marshall Faulk broke off with a 58-yard run down to the Falcons' 22-yard line. Three plays later, Warner's 17-yard scoring pass to Faulk gave the Rams a 28–0 lead. Faulk had his first 100-yard game for the Rams with 172 yards from scrimmage. After the Falcons got their only points midway through the third quarter. Warner broke loose for a 5-yard touchdown run as the Rams have their first win against Atlanta since 1996.

Week 4: at Cincinnati Bengals

With this win the Rams moved to 3–0 in Kurt Warner's first three games as starting quarterback

Week 5: vs. San Francisco 49ers

The Rams got off to a strong start with Kurt Warner throwing touchdown passes to Isaac Bruce on each of the team’s first three possessions. Isaac Bruce totaled 134 receiving yards and four touchdowns during the game. This game ended the Rams’ 17-game losing streak against the 49ers that began in 1990.  It was also the Rams' first home win against the 49ers since 1986, when they were located in Los Angeles.

Week 6: at Atlanta Falcons

Faulk gained 181 rushing yards, and the Rams defense generated two interceptions and four sacks. The Rams moved to 5–0 with this win over the 1998 NFC champions.

Week 7: vs. Cleveland Browns

Marshall Faulk ran for 133 yards, and the Rams defense racked up three turnovers. The Rams ran their record to 6–0 against the revived Cleveland franchise.

Week 8: at Tennessee Titans

Despite a second half comeback, 21 unanswered first half points by Titans, due in part to two first-quarter fumbles by Kurt Warner in the Rams’ own half that Tennessee converted into touchdowns, enables them to inflict the Rams’ first defeat in a Super Bowl preview. Rams right offensive tackle Fred Miller had a miserable game, committing five false starts and two holding penalties.

Week 9: at Detroit Lions

Detroit converted a 4th-and-26 in the fourth quarter on the game-winning touchdown drive.

Week 10: vs. Carolina Panthers

Week 11: at San Francisco 49ers

With this win the Rams swept the 49ers for the first time since the 1980 season nineteen years previously.

Week 12: vs. New Orleans Saints

Week 13: at Carolina Panthers

    
    
    
    
    
    
    
    
    

The Rams won their tenth game and clinched the NFC West Division title for the first time since 1985.

Week 14: at New Orleans Saints

    
    
    
    
    
    
    
    
    

The Rams pass defense pressured the Saints offense, racking up three interceptions and six sacks. The Rams clinched a first-round bye for the first time under the playoff format adopted in 1990.

Week 15: vs. New York Giants

    
    
    
    
    
    
    

With a 12–2 record with two games remaining, the Rams clinched home field advantage for the first time since 1978.

Week 16: vs. Chicago Bears

    
    
    
    
    
    
    
    

Marshall Faulk racked up 204 receiving yards, in addition to 54 rushing yards on 10 carries. With this victory, the Rams set single-season franchise records for most home wins with 8 and most overall wins with 13 (a record they would break two years later). Additionally, the Rams finished with a perfect home record for the first time since the 1973 season.

Week 17: at Philadelphia Eagles

    
    
    
    
    
    
    
    
    
    
    

The Rams traveled to Philadelphia for their season finale against the struggling Eagles. The Rams rested a number of starters for much of the game, having already clinched home-field playoffs. Despite dominating Philadelphia offensively, St. Louis was doomed by a seven-turnover afternoon, with three lost fumbles and four interceptions, two of which were returned for Eagles touchdowns. The Rams lost, 38–31, but nevertheless earned the top seed in the NFC playoffs with a 13–3 record.

Standings

Kurt Warner

Warner was the backup quarterback for the St. Louis Rams during the 1998 regular season and the 1999 preseason. When starting quarterback Trent Green was injured in a preseason game, Warner took over as the starter. With the support of running back Marshall Faulk and wide receivers Isaac Bruce, Torry Holt, Az-Zahir Hakim and Ricky Proehl, Warner completed one of the top seasons by a quarterback in NFL history by throwing for 4,353 yards with 41 touchdown passes and a completion rate of 65.1 percent. The Rams' high-powered offense was nicknamed "The Greatest Show on Turf" and registered the first in a string of three consecutive 500-point seasons, an NFL record.  Warner threw three touchdown passes in each of the first three games in the 1999 season, his first three NFL starts.  He is the only NFL quarterback in history to accomplish that feat, and only the second other than Dan Marino to do it in his first two NFL starts.

Warner really drew attention, however, in the season's fourth game against the San Francisco 49ers, who had been NFC West Division champs for 12 of the previous 13 seasons.  The Rams had lost 17 of their previous 18 meetings with the 49ers and had a 3–0 record along with the 49ers’ 3–1 record.  Warner threw three touchdown passes on the Rams' first three possessions of the game and four in the first half to propel the Rams to a 28–10 halftime lead on the way to a 42–20 victory.  Warner finished the game with five touchdown passes, giving him 14 in four games and, more importantly, the Rams a 4–0 record.  After many years of defeats and losing records, football experts finally had to take notice.

Warner's breakout season from a career in anonymity was so unexpected that Sports Illustrated featured him on their October 18 cover with the caption “Who IS this guy?”  He was named the 1999 NFL MVP at the season's end.

In the NFL playoffs, Warner led the Rams to a Super Bowl XXXIV victory against the Tennessee Titans. He threw for two touchdowns and a then Super Bowl record 414 passing yards, including a 73-yard touchdown to Isaac Bruce when the game was tied with just over two minutes to play. Warner also set a Super Bowl record by attempting 45 passes without a single interception.

Warner was awarded the 1999 Super Bowl MVP, becoming one of only six players to win both the league MVP and Super Bowl MVP awards in the same year. The others are Bart Starr in 1966, Terry Bradshaw in 1978, Joe Montana in 1989, Emmitt Smith in 1993, and Steve Young in 1994.

Playoffs

NFC Divisional Playoff

As expected, this match between the two high powered offenses produced a lot of points (86), and yards (880, 475 by St. Louis, 405 by Minnesota). But after falling behind 17–14, St. Louis stormed to victory with 35 consecutive second half points to open a 49–17 lead early in the fourth quarter. Warner threw for 391 yards and five touchdown passes to five different receivers, and Bruce accounted for 133 receiving yards. 
It was also the first NFL Playoff game ever played in St. Louis.

NFC Championship Game

The Rams and Buccaneers, a rematch of the 1979 NFC Championship game, would slug it out for most of the game, with the Buccaneers defense holding the Rams highly-potent offense in check. 
Tampa Bay, weak on offense, could only muster 163 passing yards all game against the Rams defense, with the Rams defense notching two interceptions and five sacks.
The Buccaneers would only muster two field goals, and gave up a costly safety in the second quarter when a bad snap from center went over the head of rookie quarterback Shaun King and out of the endzone. Despite this, the Buccaneers nursed an unusual 6–5 lead into the 4th Quarter. The Rams broke open a defense dominated game when Kurt Warner threw a touchdown pass to Ricky Proehl, his first and only touchdown catch of the season, with 4:44 left in the game.

The Buccaneers would mount a drive on their final possession, however a replay overturned what appeared to be a 2nd down reception by Buccaneers wide receiver Bert Emanuel which would have set up a short-yardage 3rd down. Emanuel dove for a catch and clasped the ball between two hands, then upon falling, the ball touched the turf while in Emanuel's hands. The ruling on the field was a completed catch, but was overturned on review because the ball had touched the ground before Emanuel was deemed in possession of it. Following this, the Buccaneers threw incomplete passes on 3rd and 4th down and the Rams were able to kneel out the clock.

This was the Rams’ first NFC Championship win since the 1979 season.

Super Bowl XXXIV
The first half of Super Bowl XXXIV had been uncharacteristically low-scoring for St. Louis, as they scored only three Jeff Wilkins field goals in the first half. The Rams finally got into the end zone in the third quarter, with a 9-yard touchdown pass from Warner to Torry Holt, giving St. Louis a 16–0 lead. Tennessee, however, scored 16 unanswered points with two Eddie George touchdown runs (1- and 2-yards respectively, the first with a failed two-point conversion attempt), and a 43-yard Al Del Greco field goal.

On St. Louis’ first play from scrimmage after Tennessee's tying field goal, Warner threw a 73-yard touchdown to Isaac Bruce to take a 23–16 lead with just under two minutes left in the game, which would give Tennessee one more chance to tie the game with a touchdown.

The Titans took over the ball at their own 10-yard line with 1:54 left in the game after committing a holding penalty on the ensuing kickoff. McNair started out the drive with a pair of completions to Mason and Wycheck for gains of 9 and 7 yards to reach the 28-yard line. Then after throwing an incompletion, defensive back Dre' Bly’s 15-yard facemask penalty while tackling McNair on a 12-yard scramble gave the Titans a first down at the St. Louis 45-yard line. On the next play, St. Louis was penalized 5 yards for being offsides, moving the ball to the 40-yard line with 59 seconds left. McNair then ran for 2 yards, followed by a 7-yard completion to wide receiver Kevin Dyson. Three plays later, with the Titans facing 3rd down and 5 to go, McNair was hit by two Rams’ defenders, but he escaped and completed a 16-yard pass to Dyson to gain a first down at the Rams 10-yard line.

Tennessee then used up their final timeout with just 6 seconds left in the game, giving them a chance for one last play. McNair threw a short pass to Kevin Dyson down the middle, which looked certain to tie up the game until Rams linebacker Mike Jones tackled Dyson at the one-yard line as time expired. Dyson tried to stretch his arm and the football across the goal line, but he had already gone down, so it was too late. This final play has gone down in NFL history as simply “The Tackle”.

Team statistics 
Led NFL in total yards (400.8 yards per game)
Led NFL in passing yards (272.1 yards per game)
Led NFL in scoring (32.9 points per game)
Led NFL in rushing defense (74.3 yards per game)
Led NFL (tied with JAX) in sacks (57)

Player awards and records
 Kurt Warner, Bert Bell Award
 Kurt Warner, NFL MVP
 Kurt Warner, Super Bowl Most Valuable Player
 Dick Vermeil, Coach of the Year
 Marshall Faulk, Daniel F. Reeves Memorial Award (Rams MVP)
 Marshall Faulk, Offensive Player of the Year
 Torry Holt, Rams Rookie of the Year

Notes

References

External links
http://www.nfl.com/teams/schedule?team=STL&season=1999&seasonType=REG
http://www.nfl.com/teams/schedule?team=STL&season=1999&seasonType=PRE
http://rams1999season.com

St. Louis Rams seasons
St. Louis Rams
NFC West championship seasons
National Football Conference championship seasons
Super Bowl champion seasons
1999 in sports in Missouri